Some Wilderness was originally released on Kanine Records in April 2004. It has since been made available by Sub Pop.

Track listing 
 "Land!" - 4:45
 "1991 Kids" - 3:42
 "The Money You Have Is Maybe Too Little" - 3:33
 "Cumberland Gap" - 4:24
 "Melting the Ice Queen" - 6:34
 "Totally Gay, Totally Fat" - 4:38
 "Back in Com Again" - 2:30
 "For Buds, Not Boston" - 4:23
 "General Hospital" - 4:42
 "The Tribal Rites of the New Saturday Night" - 6:31

References
 [ Allmusic album page]
 Oxford Collapse official website
 Sub Pop album page
 Kanine Records artist page

Oxford Collapse albums
2004 albums
Kanine Records albums